"Nyah nyah nyah nyah nyah nyah" is the lexigraphic representation of a common children's chant. It is a rendering of one common vocalization for a six-note musical figure which is associated with children, is found in many European-derived cultures and is often used in taunting.

Variations
There are many other vocalizations for the tune, as well as other ways of rendering the nyah-nyah version (such as "Nuh nuh nuh nuh nuh nuh"). Other manifestations include:
"Nanny nanny boo boo", "Na-na na-na boo-boo", or "Neener neener neener" in the United States
"Du kan ikke fange mig" in Denmark (meaning "You can't catch me")
"Na na na na nère" (also "nanananère") in France
"Naa na na naa na" in the Netherlands
"Na na na naa na" in Spain
"Naa na banana" in Israel (meaning "mint (and) banana")
"Läl-läl-läl-läl lie-ru" (a taunt) or "Et saa mua kiinni" in Finland (meaning "You can't catch me")
"Skvallerbytta bing bång" (meaning "Tattletale ding dong") or "Du kan inte ta mig" in Sweden (meaning "You can't catch me")
"Ædda bædda buse" in Norway
"Lero lero" in Mexico 
"La la la la la la" in Turkish 
"Wêla kapela" in Southern Africa

The tune is also heard in Canada, Australia, Spain, Portugal, Germany, Serbia, Slovenia, Bosnia and Herzegovina, United Kingdom, Poland, and Iceland. Children in Korea use a different figure for teasing, la-so-la-so mi-re-mi-re with the vocalization 얼레리 꼴레리 (eol-re-ri kkol-re-ri) while a Japanese variant is so-so-mi-mi so-mi-mi and in Mexico a so-la-so-mi, so-la-so-mi figure is found.

The initial taunt is sometimes followed by further verses using the same tune, for instance in America "Nanny nanny nanny goat, cannot catch a billy goat" or following "Nanny nanny boo boo" with "Stick your head in doo-doo". French children might follow "Na na na na nère" with "Pouette pouette camembert". In Croatia, children sing "Ulovi me, ulovi me, kupit ću ti novine. Novine su skupe, poljubi me u dupe" (which means: "Catch me, catch me, [if you do that] I'll buy you a newspaper. Newspapers are pricey, kiss my tushie").

While the word "nyah" is now defined as being in and of itself an expression of contemptuous superiority over another, this is by derivation from the "nyah-nyah..." chant rather than vice versa so the "nyah-nyah..." vocalization version of the chant is, at least in origin, an example of communication entirely by paralanguage. Context-meaningful words are sometimes applied ad hoc, though, such as  "Johnny is a sis-sy", “I got the blue one”, or "I can see your underwear!" Shirley Jackson referred to it as the "da da, da-da da" or "I know a secret" chant in Life Among the Savages.

Other uses
Non-taunting uses are also seen, also associated with children. One tune for Ring a Ring o' Roses (which is sung to many variant tunes) uses the "Nyah nyah..." musical figure; a common tune for Bye, baby Bunting uses a similar figure, and one for Olly olly in free does also. The tune is used as an advertising jingle by the confectionery company Haribo.

Benjamin Britten used the figure in his 1946 opera The Rape of Lucretia for a scene where the Roman and Etruscan generals mock each other.

Descendents centered the song "I Don't Want To Grow Up" around the figure in their 1985 album of the same name.

See also

 Children's song
 Cocking a snook
 Blowing a raspberry

Notes

References

Further reading
 

Playground songs